The following lists the top 25 (end of year) charting singles on the Australian Singles Charts, for the year of 1985. These were the best charting singles in Australia for 1985. The source for this year is the Kent Music Report.

These charts are calculated by David Kent of the Kent Music Report.

References

Australian record charts
1985 in Australian music
1985 record charts